The Cyprus Library is the national library of the Republic of Cyprus.

Chronology
 1927 – Establishment of the Cyprus Public Library on the initiative of the British Colonial Governor Sir Ronald Storrs.
 1968 – The Cyprus Public Library Law moves control of the library (from municipal control) to the Ministry of Education and Culture; merge of its collections with the Ministry's Library. 
 1974 – Relocation to its original premises on the D'Avila Bastion of the Venetian walls of Nicosia.
 1987 – New law establishing the Cyprus Library.

References

Cypriot culture
National libraries
1927 establishments in Cyprus
Libraries established in 1927
Libraries in Cyprus